Replete is an unincorporated community in Webster County, West Virginia, United States. Replete had a post office, which closed on January 21, 1989. An early variant name was Mount Pleasant.

References

Unincorporated communities in Webster County, West Virginia
Unincorporated communities in West Virginia